The Benjamin Shotwell House, or the Shotwell-Runyon House, is a historic house in Edison, Middlesex County, New Jersey. The house was listed on the New Jersey Register of Historic Places and National Register of Historic Places in 1987. The farm on which is located in part of Route 287.
 The Shotwells were  early settlers of "The Plains", an early reference to Plainfield, New Jersey.

See also
Homestead Farm at Oak Ridge
List of the oldest buildings in New Jersey

References

External links
www.historicmapworks.com
www.plainfieldquakers.org
Annals of our Colonial Ancestors and their Descendants, text-only version
Shotwell Family Annals - Annals of our Colonial Ancestors and their Descendants, Google Books

Houses completed in 1775
Edison, New Jersey
Houses on the National Register of Historic Places in New Jersey
Houses in Middlesex County, New Jersey
National Register of Historic Places in Middlesex County, New Jersey
New Jersey Register of Historic Places